Kangasvesi is a medium-sized lake in the Vuoksi main catchment area. It is located in the North Karelia region, in the municipality of Kontiolahti.

See also
List of lakes in Finland

References

Lakes of Kontiolahti